The 2010 Pacific Rugby Cup was the fifth edition of the Pacific Rugby Cup competition.  First held in 2006, the 2010 edition, like its predecessors, featured 6 representative rugby union football teams; 2 from each of the three Pacific rugby unions - Fiji, Samoa and Tonga.

Fiji Warriors won the championship, defeating Fiji Barbarians in the final.

Teams and format
The 6 participating teams were:
Upolu Samoa and Savaii Samoa from Samoa
Fiji Warriors and Fiji Barbarians from Fiji
Tau'uta Reds and Tautahi Gold from Tonga

The teams played a single round robin (home or away) series. The two top teams in the final standings met in the grand final match, with the first ranking team awarded home advantage.

Stadiums

Table

{| class="wikitable"
|-
!width=165|Team
!width=40|Played
!width=40|Won
!width=40|Drawn
!width=40|Lost
!width=40|For
!width=40|Against
!width=40|Point difference
!width=40|Bonus points
!width=40|Points
|-  style="background:#cfc; text-align:center;"
|align=left| Fiji Warriors
|5||4||0||1||155||73||+82||3||19
|-  style="background:#cfc; text-align:center;"
|align=left| Fiji Barbarians 
|5||4||0||1||145||116||+29||3||19
|- align=center
|align=left| Tautahi Gold
|5||3||0||2||102||93||+9||2||14
|- align=center
|align=left| Savaii Samoa
|5||2||0||3||105||110||−5||2||10
|- align=center
|align=left| Upolu Samoa 
|5||1||0||4||94||122||−28||3||7
|- align=center
|align=left| Tau'uta Reds
|5||1||0||4||82||169||−87||1||5	

|- bgcolor="#ffffff" align=center
|colspan="15"|Source: oceaniarugby.com
|}
{| class="wikitable collapsible collapsed" style="text-align:center; line-height:100%; font-size:100%; width:60%;"
|-
! colspan="4" style="border:0px" |Competition rules
|-
| colspan="4" | Points breakdown:4 points for a win2 points for a draw1 bonus point for a loss by seven points or less1 bonus point for scoring four or more tries in a match
Classification:Teams standings are calculated as follows:Most log points accumulated from all matchesMost log points accumulated in matches between tied teamsHighest difference between points scored for and against accumulated from all matchesMost points scored accumulated from all matches
|}

Match results

Round 1

Round 2

Round 3

Round 4

Round 5

Final

References

External links
FORU website 

World Rugby Pacific Challenge
Pacific Rugby Cup
Pacific Rugby Cup
Pacific Rugby Cup
Pacific Rugby Cup
Pacific